RIS Científica is a television series co-produced by Videomedia and the Spanish network Telecinco and released by the latter. It is an adaptation of the Italian series RIS Delitti Imperfetti in turn inspired by the American production CSI.

It premiered on September 23, 2007. The first two episodes were broadcast in prime time on Sunday, with a lower than average audience share, so from October 9 it was moved to Tuesday at 22: 00. On December 18, the last episode was screened, with no announcement of a second season.

Plot summary
The series follows the team of forensic experts in Spain who are trying to solve crimes with the help of forensic evidence. The location of the series is Madrid. This is the first series in the RIS franchise that has been cancelled.

Cast
Ricardo Ventura (José Coronado) is the new head of the special unit of the scientific police, after replacing Cuevas.
Ana Galeano (Irene Montalà) is the computer expert, newly incorporated into the unit.
David Conde, is a ballistics unit expert.
Claudia Barrea (Belén López) is from the medical examiner Unit. She maintains a non-committal relationship with Ventura.
Martín Orce (Carlos Leal), is the chemistry and biology specialist.
Damián Bermejo (Pedro Casablanc) is a veteran police interrogation expert.
Guillermo Cuevas (Juan Fernández) is the creator of this special police unit. After twenty years as its head, his superiors compel him to retire early because of a degenerative disease, a fact that will point to a dark side to his character.

Episodes
List of RIS Cientifica episodes

See also
 RIS Delitti Imperfetti, original series
 R.I.S, police scientifique, the French remake
 R. I. S. – Die Sprache der Toten, the German remake

Telecinco network series
2007 Spanish television series debuts
2007 Spanish television series endings
Spanish police procedural television series
2000s Spanish drama television series
Spanish-language television shows
2000s police procedural television series